Pumati Israela is a Cook Islands politician and former member of the Cook Islands Parliament. He is a member of the One Cook Islands Movement.

Israela served as Aitutaki infrastructure manager from 1989 to 2016 and Mayor of Aitutaki from 1992 to 1995. He was first elected to Parliament in the 2016 Arutanga-Reureu-Nikaupara by-election following the conviction of One Cook Islands leader Teina Bishop for corruption. He was formally sworn in as an MP in June 2017. He was not re-elected at the 2018 election.

References

Living people
Members of the Parliament of the Cook Islands
One Cook Islands Movement politicians
Year of birth missing (living people)